Heart Attack (Freelance:Ham puay... Ham phak... Ham rak mor) is a 2015 romantic Thai film written and directed by Nawapol Thamrongrattanarit. It stars Sunny Suwanmethanon, Davika Hoorne, Violette Wautier and Torpong Chantabubph. The film follows Yoon, a workaholic 30-year-old freelancer who falls in love with his doctor. He suffered a heart attack when she was in progress but couldn't find a way to tell her about his undying love.

Cast 
Sunny Suwanmethanon as Yoon
Davika Hoorne as Imm
Violette Wautier as Je
Torpong Chantabubph as Peng
Nottapon Boonprakob as Kai

Surattanawee Suviporn (Bo) and Kornpassorn Ratanameathanont (Joyce) of Triumphs Kingdom make a cameo appearance as themselves. GTH's director Banjong Pisanthanakun makes a cameo appearance as a doctor. Another director, Adisorn Trisirikasem, also makes a cameo appearance as Je's boyfriend.

Music 
The score for Heart Attack was composed by Vichaya Vatanasapt at Hualumpong Riddim. The song "Vacation Time", sung by Violette Wautier and Stamp Apiwat Eurthavornsuk, was originally written and sung in English by the band "Part Time Musicians". The lyrics were rewritten into Thai by Apiwat Eurthavornsuk and Tarit Chiarakul.

References

External links 
 
 
 

Thai romantic drama films
GMM Tai Hub films
Best Picture Suphannahong National Film Award winners